Muthu Salamba is a 2011 Sri Lankan Sinhala adult drama film directed by Kusumchandra Gamage and produced by Wijeratne Gamage. It stars Lal Weerasinghe and Anusha Damayanthi in lead roles along with Udith Abeyrathne and Chanchala Warnasuriya. Music composed by Sarath de Alwis. It is the 1157th Sri Lankan film in the Sinhala cinema.

Cast
 Lal Weerasinghe as Vishwa
 Anusha Damayanthi
 Dilani Madurasinghe
 Udith Abeyratne
 Vishaka Siriwardana
 Nalin Pradeep Udawela
 Jeevan Handunnetti
 Chanchala Warnasuriya

References

External links
 

2011 films
2010s Sinhala-language films
2011 drama films
Sri Lankan drama films